David Barry Gauld  (born 28 June 1942) is a New Zealand mathematician. He is a professor of mathematics at the University of Auckland.

Biography
Within mathematics, Gauld works in set-theoretic topology, with emphasis on applications to non-metrisable manifolds and topological properties of manifolds close to metrisability. Gauld has authored two monographs and over 70 research papers.

Gauld was born on 28 June 1942 in Inglewood and grew up there. He was educated at Wanganui Technical College, Inglewood High School and New Plymouth Boys’ High School, and later obtained his BSc and MSc degrees with first-class honours in mathematics from the University of Auckland. Awarded a Fulbright Grant, he completed his PhD in topology, in the University of California, Los Angeles, supervised by Robion Kirby. He was Head of the Department of Mathematics for 15 years and Assistant Vice-Chancellor (Research) for two-and-a-half years at the University of Auckland.

Honours
In the years 1981–1982, Gauld served as president of the New Zealand Mathematical Society.
He was the founding secretary of the New Zealand Mathematics Research Institute,
and served in this position for 13 years, retiring in 2011.
In 1997, he was awarded a New Zealand Science and Technology Medal by the Royal Society of New Zealand.
In 2015, he became an honorary life
member of the New Zealand Mathematical Society.
In the 2016 New Year Honours, Gauld was appointed an Officer of the New Zealand Order of Merit for services to mathematics.

References

1942 births
Living people
New Zealand mathematicians
Academic staff of the University of Auckland
University of Auckland alumni
University of California, Los Angeles alumni
People educated at Inglewood High School, New Zealand
People educated at New Plymouth Boys' High School
Officers of the New Zealand Order of Merit